Ah You is a surname. People with this surname include:

 Harland Ah You (born 1972), American football player
 Junior Ah You (born 1948), American and Canadian footballer
 C. J. Ah You (born 1982), American football player
 Rodney Ah You (born 1988), New Zealand Rugby Union player